Samta may refer to:

Samta, India, a village and a gram panchayat in Howrah, West Bengal, India
Samtah or Samta, a village and sub-division in Jizan Province, Saudi Arabia
Samta colony, an area in Raipur, Chhattisgarh, India
Samta sthal, the memorial to Jagjivan Ram, in the vicinity of Raj Ghat, in Delhi, India

People with the name
Samta Prasad, an Indian classical musician and a tabla player from the Benares gharana
Samta Benyahia, an Algerian French artist

See also
Samata (disambiguation)